GEK Terna Holding Real Estate Construction is a large Greek conglomerate which is listed on the Athens Exchange. Its construction branch Terna is one of the leading enterprises of its sector in Greece.

GEK Terna's electric utilities branch Terna Energy lately focussed on the production and transmission of renewable energy. Through its subsidiary Heron S.A., it is as well involved in the construction and operation of thermoelectric power generation fuelled with natural gas. Terna Energy is listed separately on the Athens Exchange.

Company
The company was formed when former competitors GEK and TERNA merged in 1999. Until 2008, GEK was the name of the holding with TERNA being its operational branch. The Athens-based company has been listed at the Athens Exchange since 1969 and belongs to the 25 companies forming the FTSE/Athex Large Cap index. In 2013, U.S. investment firm York Capital Magagement bought a 10% share of the company.

Rail privatization bid
Following the Greek government-debt crisis, GEK Terna showed interest in the planned privatization of Greek state-owned railway carrier TrainOSE. Together with the state-owned railway companies of Russia and France, RZD and SNCF, and Romanian private railway carrier Grup Feroviar Roman, it placed a joint bid for TrainOSE and the Hellenic Company for Rolling Stock Maintenance (Rosco), currently held by the Hellenic Republic Asset Development Fund. Following the January 2015 legislative election, the new SYRIZA-led administration however put the decision under review.

See also

 Energy in Greece

References

Sources

External links
 — + 

Construction and civil engineering companies of Greece
Conglomerate companies of Greece
Renewable energy companies of Greece
Companies based in Athens
Energy companies established in 1969
Renewable resource companies established in 1969
Conglomerate companies established in 1969
Companies listed on the Athens Exchange
Greek brands
Greek companies established in 1969